Echoes & Images is the second studio album by American singer and songwriter Sylvia St. James, released in 1981 by Elektra Records.

Production 
The album was produced by Andre Fischer with the arrangements by Richard Evans and McKinley Jackson. Lead and background vocals were arranged by St. James.

Conception and composition 
The singer's second recording project continues a mixture of pop and soul songs with the release of the first single, "Behind My Back", an upbeat, dance track, alongside Eastern influence in the arrangements of "Grace", featuring the 13-stringed Japanese koto, and "Eastern Man" with the four-stringed Japanese lute.

Critical reception 

Warren Gerds of the Green Bay Press Gazette declared "Sylvia St. James owns a great voice - a Cadillac..." describing "lavish backgroundings" and stating "soul, rhythm kickers, jazz or ballad, St. James pours out vocal gymnastics with her wide-ranging, lustrous singing"
Florestine Purnell for The Kansas City Star opined "a unique mixture of pop and other musical influences that still retain Miss St. James' soulful individuality" describing instruments that give "a vaguely Oriental feel" to songs with "quiet melodies with complex string and horn arrangements" and the upbeat single with "a familiar theme" and "danceable beat".A review for Billboard Album picks described "high-quality musical art" with "can't-miss production" of "soul/jazz excursions that command top musicianship" and "vocals roles with impressive range, drama and funk appeal"while Billboard Disco Mix noted "easy going but sassy selections", "tender ballads" and sensual vocals shining through "Grace".

Track listing

Covers
Yves Tumor samples "Grace", in his critically acclaimed 2018 single Noid.

References

External links 
 

1981 albums
Elektra Records albums